Marshall Hall FRS (18 February 1790 – 11 August 1857) was an English physician, physiologist and early neurologist. His name is attached to the theory of reflex arc mediated by the spinal cord, to a method of resuscitation of drowned people, and to the elucidation of function of capillary vessels.

Biography 

Hall was born on 18 February 1790 at Basford, near Nottingham, England, where his father, Robert Hall, was a cotton  manufacturer. He was a brother of the inventor Samuel Hall. Having attended the Rev. J. Blanchard's academy at Nottingham, he entered a chemists shop at Newark-on-Trent, and in 1809 began to study medicine at Edinburgh University. In 1811 he was elected senior president of the Royal Medical Society; the following year he took the M.D. degree, and was immediately appointed resident house physician to the Edinburgh Royal Infirmary. This appointment he resigned after two years, when he visited Paris and its medical schools, and, on a walking tour, those also of Berlin and Göttingen.

In 1817, when he settled at Nottingham, he published his Diagnosis, and in 1818 he wrote the Mimoses, a work on the affections denominated bilious, nervous, &c. The next year he was elected a fellow of the Royal Society of Edinburgh, and in 1825 he became physician to the Nottingham general hospital. In 1826 he removed to London, and in the following year he published his Commentaries on the More Important Diseases of Females.

In 1835 (Principles of Investigation in Physiology), he outlined five principles to govern animal experimentation.
An experiment should never be performed if the necessary information could be obtained by observations
No experiment should be performed without a clearly defined and obtainable, objective
Scientists should be well-informed about the work of their predecessors and peers to avoid unnecessary repetition of an experiment
Justifiable experiments should be carried out with the least possible infliction of suffering (often through the use of lower, less sentient animals)
Every experiment should be performed under circumstances that would provide the clearest possible results, thereby diminishing the need for repetition of experiments.

In 1836 he issued his Observations on Blood-letting Founded on Researches on the Morbid and Curative Effects of Loss of Blood, denouncing the widespread practice of bloodletting, which was acknowledged by the medical profession to be of vast practical value, and in 1831 his Experimental Essay on the Circulation of the Blood in the Capillary Vessels, in which he was the first to show that the capillaries are intermediate channels between the arteries and the veins and put the blood in contact with biological tissues. In the following year he read before the Royal Society a paper On the Inverse Ratio which Subsists between Respiration and Irritability in the Animal Kingdom.

His most important work in physiology was concerned with the theory of reflex action, embodied in a paper On the Reflex Function of the Medulla Oblongata and the Medulla Spinalis (1833), which was supplemented in 1837 by another On the True Spinal Marrow, and the Excito-motor System of Nerves. In this theory, he stated that the spinal cord is comprised by a chain of units that functions as an independent reflex arcs, and their activity integrates sensory and motor nerves at the segment of the spinal cord from which these nerves originate. He proposed in addition that those arcs are interconnected and interacting in the production of coordinated movement.

The reflex function excited great attention on the continent of Europe, though in England some of his papers were refused publication by the Royal Society. Hall thus became the authority on the multiform deranged states of health referable to an abnormal condition of the nervous system, and he gained a large practice.

Hall also published books on neurological diseases including stroke (apoplexy) and epilepsy.

In Asphyxia, its Rationale and its Remedy (1856), Hall developed a technique for preventing victims of drowning by freeing their respiratory airway and by providing immediate ventilation, as the initial steps in resuscitation.

He was elected as a member to the American Philosophical Society in 1853.

He died at Brighton of a throat infection, aggravated by lecturing, on 11 August 1857 and was buried in Nottingham.  One of his grandsons was the musician Marshall Hall. ;)

Religious views 
Hall was a devout Christian who believed in the divinity of Christ. A collection of his religious thoughts on his journals and letters was collected by his widow in the biographical book Memoirs of Marshall Hall, by his widow. There, he is quoted speaking about Christ:

In his treatise On the diseases and derangements of the nervous system (1841), he evoked the design argument, stating about the physiological activity of the body:

Abolitionism 
Hall was also an abolitionist. When he travelled to the United States, in his later years, he was shocked by what he saw, and was shocked at how slavery was sanctioned in the States. An admirer of William Wilberforce, he wrote The two-fold slavery of the United States; with a project of self-emancipation (1854), where he denounced the slave system and spoke about "a second slavery" of racial prejudice. He set then his opinion on slavery, stating:

In his book, he proposed as project of emancipation that African-American people continue to produce cotton, sugar and rice, but to freely help and prosper themselves. On the same religious grounds, he questioned the permission of polygamy in the US and insisted that imposing the slavery system and denying marriage to black people was a sin which caused a "deprivation of education, of holy marriage, of parental rights".:

He believed that every slaveholder had a "guilt of sin against God, and of sin against his fellow-man" and insisted that there was no credible hypothesis to rationally support white supremacy, stating:

Notes

References

External links
 Trauma resuscitation.
 Marshall Hall's The principles of diagnosis (New York, 1839).

1790 births
1857 deaths
People from Basford, Nottinghamshire
British physiologists
British neuroscientists
History of neuroscience
Alumni of the University of Edinburgh
Fellows of the Royal Society of Edinburgh
Fellows of the Royal Society
English Christians
British abolitionists
Christian abolitionists